The Museum der Völker in the Austrian Schwaz in the county of Tyrol was founded in 1995 as a cultural association Haus der Völker by Gert Chesi and belongs to the well known Ethnology museums in Europe. After a new construction and remodeling the exhibition operation opened on the 12th of April 2013 as Museum der Völker. Translated the name means museum of the peoples or museum of the tribes.

History 
Gert Chesi, photographer, journalist and author, had collected more than a thousand exhibits from all over the world in the period of fifty years. The art objects are the base of the Museum operation and give an insight into the religious and artistic creation of mankind.

Cultural Club 
Today the cultural club Museum der Völker runs the museum. Art objects from distant cultures determine the Museum: Stone sculptures of Khmer, Buddha images from many eras, terracotta figures of the Nok, ancestral figures of the Dajak, grave finds from China and old bronzes from South-East Asia are displayed in addition to contemporary Voodoo objects and utensils of animism.

Exhibitions 
Artifacts from over a period of four thousand years ethnographic exhibits from four themes will be presented to the public:
Africa
Asia
Archaeology
Afro-American syncretism

Collections 
Currently, in fall 2020, the museum celebrates its 25 years anniversary as well as its founder Gert Chesi´s 80th birthday by a special exhibition.

Another special exhibition is about Ethiopia and a local medical doctor who worked there in the 1950s and very early 1960s. A permanent exhibition is about Asian religions and its interest to the western world.

 2010 Schätze aus dem Depot
 2010: Textile Kunst aus Afrika
 2010: Das Erbe Chinas
 2011 Feuer und Erz – Schmiede und Gießer in Afrika
 2011: Afrikas Moderne im Spiegel der Generationen
 2011: Wohnen mit den Ahnen
 2011: Jubiläumsausstellung 15 Jahre Haus der Völker
 2012: Magische Stoffe – gewobene Träume – Kunstvolle Textilien aus Indonesien
 2013: Sangomas – Traditionelle Heiler Südafrikas, Fotografien von Peter Frank 
 2013: Geistermasken aus Thailand
 2013: AFRIKA HEUTE!
 2014: Söhne und Töchter des Windes – Die letzten Nomaden Afrikas, Fotografien von Mario Gerth
 2014: Kunst und Magie in Silber und Seide – Schmuck und Textilien chinesischer Bergvölker
 2014: Dogon, Kunst und Mythos in Zusammenarbeit mit Jan Baptist Bedaux
 2015: Tanzende Schatten - Marionetten, Puppen und Masken aus Asien
 2015: Burma - Meisterwerke des Buddhismus
 2015: Susanne Wenger - Ein Leben mit den Götterm
 2015: Zauber der Weltkulturen 20 Jahre Museum der Völker
 2015: Das Gedächtnis der Steine - Seltene Steinreliefs und Figuren aus Asien
 2016: Das Böse - Exponate aus Schwarzmagischen Kreisen
 2016: Yoruba - Meisterwerke einer Afrikanischen Hochkultur, Samstag
 2016: GLADYS - Der Maler und seine Geister - Zeitgenössische Malerei aus Benin
 2016: DAS GEHEIME KAMERUN - Fotografien von Henning Christoph 
 2016: AFRIKA IM GEWAND - Bunte Textilvielfalt eines Kontinents
 2016/2017: "Indonesien – Kunst und Kult vom Inselreich"
 2016/2017: "Bali – Insel der Götter"
09.09.2017 - 11.03.2018: Leon Pollux "Menschen"
09.09.2017 - 18.11.2018: "Zwischen Eigensinn & Anpassung"
17.03.2018 - 2019: "Unvergessen machen"
05.05.2018 - 18.11.2018: "Maasai – Baumeisterinnen aus Ololosokwan"
22.06.2018 - 18.11.2018: Schulprojekt und Ausstellung "Mein, dein, unser Raum"
08.12.2018 - 18.08.2019: "UNGEHEUER WILD"
 2019 "Zwischen Himmel und Erde"
 2019 "Richtig guter Stoff"
 2020 "Erinnerungen an Äthiopien"
 2020 Anniversary Exhibition
2021 "Weltbilder erzählen" - Re-thinking Earth
2021 "Sagenhaft" Legendary - Bathic by Rosemarie Sternagl l

Documentary Film 
please refer Gert Chesi

Decoration 
1999, the Museum der Völker received the Tyrolean Museum prize

1999 Recognition Award of the Austrian Federal Ministry for Arts and Culture 

2014 ICOM Austria, Österreichisches Museumsgütesiegel

References

External links 

 Museum der Völker Official Website
 Schell Collection Official Website
 Gert Chesi Official Website
 

History of Nigeria
Archaeological museums in Austria
Art museums and galleries in Austria
Asian art museums in Austria
Charities based in Austria
Grade I listed museum buildings
Museums in Tyrol (state)
Museums established in 1995
African art museums